Here is a list of the award winners and the films for which they won.

See also

 Bengal Film Journalists' Association Awards
 Cinema of India

References

External links
 https://web.archive.org/web/20080229010408/http://www.bfjaawards.com/

Bengal Film Journalists' Association Awards